Annals of Anatomy is a peer-reviewed scientific journal covering the field of anatomy, published by Elsevier under its "Urban and Fischer" imprint. It was established in 1886 by Karl von Bardeleben and until 1991 was published under the title Anatomischer Anzeiger by Gustav Fischer Verlag.

According to the Journal Citation Reports, the journal has a 2020 impact factor of 2.698, ranking it fifth out of 21 journals in the category "Anatomy & Morphology".

References

External links 
 

Publications established in 1886
Elsevier academic journals
Anatomy journals
English-language journals
Bimonthly journals
1886 establishments in Germany